(former Eilbeck) is a quarter of the German city of Hamburg and part of the Wandsbek borough.  It originated as a small village on the outskirts of Hamburg and was eventually incorporated when the city expanded. In 2020 the population was 22,235.

Etymology
The village was named after the small Wandse river, here named Eilbek. This is usually regarded as derived from the old German for "rushing stream", eile meaning to hurry or rush and Beck meaning river or stream. However other sources interpret the first element, Ylen or Ilen, as leech (German Egel), because in northern Germany the language is Low German.

History 

Eilbek first appears in 1247 as Ylenbeke.

During the Great Fire of Hamburg from May 5 to May 8, 1842, the center of Hamburg was destroyed. Some of the people from Hamburg-Altstadt settled in Ylenbeke.

In the Second World War Eilbek was almost completely destroyed by the heavy air raids in July 1943 (codenamed Operation Gomorrah). With the reorganization of Hamburg in 1949 Eilbek became a part of Wandsbek.

Geography
To the north and the west the quarters Barmbek-Süd, Uhlenhorst and Hohenfelde of the borough Hamburg-Nord border on Eilbek. The eastern borders are with the quarters Wandsbek and Marienthal. In the south is the quarter Hamm-Nord of the Hamburg-Mitte borough.

Demographics
In 2006 the population of the quarter of Eilbek was 20,265. In 1999 there were 12,659 households and 58.7% of all households were made up of individuals.

There were 3 elementary schools and 1 secondary school in the quarter Eilbek and 38 physicians in private practice and 5 pharmacies.

Politics
These are the results of Eilbek in the Hamburg state election:

Transportation
The Bundesstraße 75 leads through the quarter, connecting the city Lübeck in the North with Delmenhorst in Lower Saxony.  According to the Department of Motor Vehicles (Kraftfahrt-Bundesamt), 6,560 private cars were registered (328 cars/1000 people) in Eilbek.

Notes

References

 Statistical office Hamburg and Schleswig-Holstein Statistisches Amt für Hamburg und Schleswig-Holstein, official website (in German)

External links

Quarters of Hamburg
Wandsbek